Samuel H. Wragg (June 9, 1882 – May 13, 1959) was an American politician who served as President of the Massachusetts Senate from 1937 to 1939 and sheriff of Norfolk County, Massachusetts from 1939 to 1959.

Early life
Wragg was on June 9, 1882 in Needham, Massachusetts. He attended public schools in Needham and worked in manufacturing before entering politics.

Political career
Wragg served on the Needham Board of Selectmen from 1914 to 1920 and in the Massachusetts House of Representatives from 1919 to 1924. In 1924, Wragg was elected to the Massachusetts Senate. During his tenure in the Senate, Wragg chaired the Joint Committee on Municipal Finance and the special commission on public expenditures and was a member of the rules, conservation, and public welfare committees. From 1931 to 1955, Wragg also served as Needham's town moderator.

Senate leadership
In 1935, Republican James G. Moran was elected president of the Senate with the votes of 19 Democrats and 1 Republican. Moran routinely sided with the Democrats and the majority of Republican Senators voted to form a steering committee, chaired by Wragg, which would serve as the party's official organization in the Senate. In July 1936, Wragg announced that he would seek the Senate presidency in the 1937-38 session. Wragg secured more Republican support than floor leader Donald W. Nicholson and was elected president.

Sheriff of Norfolk County
In 1938, Wragg was elected Sheriff of Norfolk County. He held the position until his death on May 13, 1959.

See also
 Massachusetts legislature: 1919, 1920, 1921–1922, 1923–1924, 1925–1926, 1927–1928, 1929–1930, 1931–1932, 1933–1934, 1935–1936, 1937–1938

References

1882 births
1959 deaths
High Sheriffs of Norfolk County
Republican Party Massachusetts state senators
Politicians from Needham, Massachusetts
Presidents of the Massachusetts Senate
20th-century American politicians